John Patrick Burke  (January 27, 1877 – August 4, 1950) was a pitcher and outfielder in Major League Baseball. He went to St. Bonaventure University and played for the New York Giants in 1902.

External links

1877 births
1950 deaths
Major League Baseball pitchers
Major League Baseball outfielders
Baseball players from Pennsylvania
People from Hazleton, Pennsylvania
New York Giants (NL) players
Newark Sailors players
Montreal Royals players
Lancaster Red Roses players
St. Bonaventure Bonnies baseball coaches
St. Bonaventure Bonnies baseball players